Alberto Cabrera may refer to:

Alberto Cabrera (baseball) [born 1988], Dominican professional pitcher
Alberto Pedro Cabrera [1945–2000], Argentine basketball player
Alberto García Cabrera
Alberto Inocente Cabrera Álvarez